PFIC may refer to:

 Progressive familial intrahepatic cholestasis, a disease.
 Passive foreign investment company, a classification of a foreign enterprise under  US tax code.